Umargam (IAST: Umargām), also known as Umbergaon (IAST: Umbargāv) is a census town and Municipality in the Indian state of Gujarat. The town is known for its beaches, its tourist attractions, and its film industry. In 2017, the town became home to India's first nanotechnology manufacturing plant.

Demographics
As of the 2011 Indian census, Umargam had a population of 21,648. 55% percent of the city was male, while 45% was female. Umargam has a literacy rate of 71%, which is higher than the national average. Several languages are spoken in Umargam, including Gujarati, Hindi, Bhojpuri and Marathi.

Tourism
In 2012, the Government of Gujarat announced that tourism-related infrastructure will be developed in Umargam, and other towns in the region of Gujarat.

Umargam Beach is popular tourist attraction in the town of Umargam. The location is famous for its 'Chowpatty style' street food, which includes items such as Bhelpuri, Panipuri, Sevpuri, and vada pav. Horse-pulled carriages offer rides to tourists, and the beach is a popular site in the city for the annual Ganesh Chaturthi celebration and other festival like Holi, beach is mostly crowded during evening time. 
There is a small place named Sarai Fatak which is situated near to Sarigam. It is very natural place.

Climate
Umargam is located in hilly area with a uniform climate. During the summer the temperature reaches 35 °C. Monsoons prevail from mid June to September. The town receives average annual precipitation of 1718mm.

Transport 

Umargam is served by the Umargam Road railway station. It lies on the New Delhi–Mumbai main line.

Education

List of schools

Affiliated with the State Board

 Chaudhary Charan Singh School
 M.K Mehta Gujarati School
 M.M High School
 Maa Vindwasini Hindi High School
 Sacred Heart English High School
 Saraswati Hindi High School
 Solsumba Central School
 Vinod P Mishra English Medium School

Affiliated with the CBSE

 Agratha Academy
 M.K Mehta High School & College
 S.S.V Gyan Kendra School

Institutions near Umargam

 Bharti Academy High School
 CGSP College of Arts, Commerce & Science
 GES Pujya Chitre Guruji English Medium High School
 Laxmi Vidyapeeth
 Lokmanya Hindi High School
 M.B.B.I. Educational Academy & Mehernosh Junior College
 N.B Mehta Science & Commerce College
 Nation English High School & Junior College
 Pirojsha Godrej Junior Bordi College
 R.K. Desai College Of Commerce & Science
 Rofel Arts and Commerce College Vapi
 ROFEL Shri G.M. Bilakhia College of Pharmacy Vapi
 ROFEL Shri G.M.Bilakhia College of Applied Sciences Vapi
 Rustomjee Academy for Global Careers
 S.S.R College Of Arts, Commerce And Science

In popular culture 

Many television series and films have been shot in Umargam, including Ramayan, Mahabharat, Shani, Razia Sultan, Suryaputra Karn, Radhakrishn, Chandragupta Maurya, and Porus.

References

Beaches of Gujarat
Cities and towns in Valsad district